Picco is an Italian word and surname meaning "summit" or "peak", it may refer to:

People with the surname
 Costanzo Picco (1917–2009), Italian military officer and skier
 Ed Picco (born 1961), Canadian Nunavut politician
 Franco Picco (born 1955), former Italian rally raid biker
 Giandomenico Picco (born 1948), Italian diplomat and former United Nations Assistant Secretary-General for Political Affairs
 Leonel Picco (born 1998), Argentine professional footballer
 Leonello Picco (1876–1921), Italian entomologist
 Maria Angela Picco (1867–1921), Italian Roman Catholic professed religious
 Pierre Picco (born 1988), French slalom canoer

Mountains
At least two mountains in the Swiss-Italian Alps have this name:
 Picco Luigi Amedeo, a mountain on the Brouillard ridge to the summit of Mont Blanc
 Picco Muzio, a mountain below the Matterhorn

Other
 Picco (film), a 2010 German film
 Picco pipe, a minute woodwind
 Stadio Alberto Picco, a football stadium in La Spezia, Italy
 Picco 1, a German make of dumper with one rear wheel in the midline
 PiCCO — pulse contour cardiac output, medical device for monitoring cardiac output
 Picco Studio, a photography studio

See also
 Pico (disambiguation)